is a Japanese manga series written and illustrated by Akira Hiramoto. It was serialized in Kodansha's Weekly Young Magazine from February 2011 to December 2017. Yen Press licensed the manga for English release in North America. The story takes place in a renowned and very strict school previously reserved for girls. But the establishment changes its policy and educates five young men who, by their behavior, will very quickly find themselves in quarantine. They will have to face all kinds of pitfalls to get out of this critical situation and escape the clutches of the Student Union.

A 12-episode anime television series adaptation, directed by Tsutomu Mizushima, aired from July to September 2015. A live-action drama television series aired from October to December 2015.

As of March 2018, the manga had over 13 million copies in circulation. In 2013, Prison School won the 37th Kodansha Manga Award in the general category.

Plot
Hachimitsu Academy, one of the strictest girls' academies in Tokyo, has decided to admit boys into their system. Kiyoshi Fujino is one of these new boys, but he discovers to his shock that he and his four friends—Takehito "Gakuto" Morokuzu, Shingo Wakamoto, Jouji "Joe" Nezu, and Reiji "Andre" Andou—are the only male students among 1,000 girls. The draconian laws that are still in place make the school even worse, which punishes even the most minor infractions with a stay in the school's prison. The five boys all commit voyeurism in the school's bathing area with the lecherous philosophy of "all for one, one for all". Their capture and "arrest" by the Underground Student Council causes the five boys to receive an ultimatum: either stay a month in the school's Prison Block or be expelled. The boys are incarcerated in the Prison Block together and Kiyoshi is overwhelmed by the discovery that all the other boys are masochists that revel in the punishments handed to them by their attractive but vicious supervisors.

Characters

Main characters

Kiyoshi enrolled from the same middle school as Shingo. He is the first boy in Hachimitsu Academy to make contact with a girl when he befriends Chiyo, whom he develops feelings for. Although not very bright, he often comes up with the most successful plans when he's at the end of his rope. Due to several embarrassing mishaps, he becomes a regular target of Hana while in prison. So far, he is the only one of the five boys to have been sent to prison more than once. When the ASC takes over and during his second imprisonment, he becomes an ally to Mari who is also a prisoner.

Nicknamed "Gakuto", he is the bespectacled boy in the group. He has an otaku interest in the Three Kingdoms, having enrolled from the same middle school as Joe. He often uses old-fashioned speech and is highly eccentric, often regarding to himself in third person as "yours truly." While in prison, he's a regular target of Meiko's abuse. Despite his perverted behavior, he is shown to be an excellent strategist who employs tactics referenced from famed generals of either The Three Kingdoms or other ancient battles - a skill that has proven very useful in most of their plans. His love interest is Mitsuko. Due to his strategic intellect and willingness to sacrifice everything for his friends, Gakuto has quickly become a popular character in the series.

Shingo is a blonde who looks like a delinquent. His love interest is Anzu, and he is shown to be a strong pessimist. He attended the same middle school as Kiyoshi. After Kiyoshi's breakout attempt, he completely disowns and singles him out until after the USC tricks him into breaking out.

Nicknamed "Joe", he is the "misfit" of the five and has a natural interest in ants. He is always seen hooded with his head obscured and has a weak physique, suffering from a bloody cough stemming from a non-fatal form of severe stomatitis. Joe attended the same middle school as Gakuto. His love interest is Sato.

Nicknamed "Andre", he is the fat one of the group. He cares deeply about his friends, and is also an extreme masochist. He is fixated on Meiko and constantly craves punishment from her. Later on, he also develops strong feelings for Risa, which Kate easily takes advantage of.

Underground student council

Mari is the president of the underground student council. She is the daughter of Hachimitsu Academy's chairman and the sister of Chiyo. A cold and calculating figure who seeks to uphold the school's traditions and rules. From the very beginning she immediately despises the boys, and the chairman's decision of integrating the academy. Much of this stems from her own resentment of her father's perverted behavior. In middle school, Mari helped Meiko stand up for herself when she was bullied by Kate, and the two have remained close friends ever since. She, like the rest of the Kurihara family, employs a strange philosophy to judge one's character. Her philosophy is, "Anyone who likes crows isn't all bad."

Meiko is the towering bespectacled vice president of the underground student council. She is put in charge of watching over the boys while they are in prison. In middle school, she was bullied for her large breasts. The strongest student in the school, and proficient in Judo, Meiko is a harsh disciplinarian over the boys, and often punishes them for the slightest infraction, with Gakuto being a popular target. Although a powerful and intimidating figure, she deeply fears displeasing Mari, which manifests itself in body-wide excessive sweating. Similarly, she enjoys performing calisthenics, and is often seen comically performing odd exercises with a large puddle of sweat underneath her. Aside from working out, she has been shown to have a knack for cooking. Because of her voluptuous/athletic physique, her school uniform barely manages to hide her body often leading to comical wardrobe malfunctions.

Hana is the secretary of the underground student council. She mostly ends up in the worst situations with Kiyoshi, whom she eventually develops feelings for. She is also an adept martial artist, often utilizing her karate skills to brutally punish the boys if Meiko's harsh punishment doesn't work. Although she seems composed and competent, she is actually incredibly childish and understands little of boys or and fails to adapt to situations she does not expect. After her release from prison, she acts as Mari's spy for the Above Ground Student council.

Aboveground student council

Kate is the president of the aboveground student council and Mari's rival from middle school. She is the one who refers the USC to a prison sentence when they are found guilty of sabotaging the boys' sentence. She then continues to torment the USC once in prison. Proficient in aikido, and a master manipulator, Kate manages to turn the entire school against the USC, and quickly becomes a ruthless and persistent adversary to Mari and the boys, when they decide to help them. In the anime, she is seen in the epilogue of the final episode, narrating the Underground Student Council's prison sentencing to the chairman.

Risa is the vice president of the aboveground student council. She harbors a strong love for Andre and employs sadistic techniques to please him. Because of this, she develops a strong dislike for Meiko. She is also shown to be very skilled at kendo, capable of fighting off both Meiko and Hana, as well as a proficient motorcyclist in spite of her young age and minor status. In the anime, she is seen in the epilogue of the final episode, threatening Meiko should she attack Kate for demeaning Mari. 

Mitsuko is the secretary of the aboveground student council and Anzu's cousin. She has romantic feelings for Gakuto and is highly clumsy, which Kate often exploits. Kiyoshi refers to her as the "'Rube Goldberg' of Klutzes" because of her clumsiness. She writes yaoi manga as a hobby. In the anime, she is seen in the epilogue of the final episode, reaching for a book at the same time as Gakuto in the library.

Other characters

He is the chairman at Hachimitsu Academy and father of Mari and Chiyo. He is wealthy but perverted. He often sympathizes with the boys. He is a self-proclaimed "ass-man", keeping various photos of female posteriors in his office, even looking at them while scheduling appointments with other characters. He, like the rest of the Kurihara family employs a strange philosophy to judge one's character. His philosophy is, "Anyone who likes butts isn't all bad".

Chiyo is Kiyoshi's classmate and watches sumo wrestling as a hobby. Kiyoshi has a crush on her, however it is not known whether she reciprocates this or not. She is Mari's sister and has deep respect for her. She, like the rest of the Kurihara family employs a strange philosophy to judge one's character. Her philosophy is, "Anyone who likes sumo wrestling isn't all bad". At the end of the series, she replaces Mari as the president of the Underground Student Council.

Anzu is a former spy for the Underground Student Council and Mitsuko's cousin. She has romantic feelings for Shingo, and is a year older than him.

A student at Hachimitsu Academy; the love interest of Joe. She unwittingly stops Joe from returning to imprisonment. She only appears in the OVA.

Chiyo's best friend who is most often seen in her company, and aided her in warning the boys of their impending expulsion.

Media

Manga

Prison School, written and illustrated by Akira Hiramoto, was serialized in Kodansha's seinen manga magazine Weekly Young Magazine from February 7, 2011 to December 25, 2017. Kodansha collected its chapters in twenty-eight tankōbon volumes, released from June 6, 2011 to April 6, 2018.

In North America, the manga was licensed for English release by Yen Press. They published the series in fourteen omnibus volumes, containing two original tankōbon volumes each, from July 21, 2015 to October 29, 2019.

Anime
An anime television series adaptation was announced in August 2014. The series was produced by Genco, Egg Firm, Warner Bros. Japan, Kodansha, Showgate, Klockworx, Movic, and J.C. Staff. It was directed by Tsutomu Mizushima, with Michiko Yokote handling series composition and writing the scripts, Junichirō Taniguchi designing the characters and props and Kōtarō Nakagawa composing the music. The anime aired on Tokyo MX, KBS, Sun TV, TV Aichi and BS11 from July to September 2015. The voice actors of the five male main characters performed the opening and ending theme songs under the group name Kangoku Danshi.

An original animation DVD was bundled with the limited edition 20th volume of the manga that was released on March 4, 2016. The OAD adapted the manga's Mad Wax story arc. Following Sony's acquisition of Crunchyroll, the series was moved to Crunchyroll.

List of episodes

TV drama
A live-action television drama adaptation was announced in August 2015, directed by Noboru Iguchi at production studio Robot. The series premiered on October 26, 2015; and aired on MBS and TBS. The opening theme song is  performed by HaKU.

Reception
As of March 2018, the manga had over 13 million copies in circulation.

Prison School was one of two winners of the Best General Manga award, alongside Gurazeni at the 37th Kodansha Manga Award in 2013. The broadcast dub version of the anime was criticized for altering the original meaning of a line while referencing the Gamergate controversy, written by Tyson Rinehart.

Notes

References

External links
 
 
 
 
 

Funimation page: PS, PSLA

2011 manga
Crunchyroll anime
J.C.Staff
Kodansha manga
Prisons in anime and manga
School life in anime and manga
Seinen manga
Sex comedy anime and manga
Tokyo MX original programming
Winner of Kodansha Manga Award (General)
Yen Press titles